Antonyuk is a surname. Notable people with this name include the following:

Darya Antonyuk (born 1996), Russian singer
Marina Antonyuk (born 1962), Russian shot put athlete
Michael Antonyuk (1935 – 1993), Kazakhstani artist
Volodymyr Antonyuk (fl.2004 – 2012), Ukrainian Paralympic footballer
Yekaterina Antonyuk (born 1974), Belarusian cross-country skier

See also

Antoniuk (name)

Patronymic surnames